The Soviet Union, officially the Union of Soviet Socialist Republics (USSR), was a transcontinental country spanning most of northern Eurasia that existed from 30 December 1922 to 26 December 1991. A flagship communist state, it was nominally a federal union of fifteen national republics; in practice, both its government and its economy were highly centralized until its final years. It was a one-party state governed by the Communist Party of the Soviet Union, with the city of Moscow serving as its capital as well as that of its largest and most populous republic: the Russian SFSR. Other major cities included Leningrad (Russian SFSR), Kiev (Ukrainian SSR), Minsk (Byelorussian SSR), Tashkent (Uzbek SSR), Alma-Ata (Kazakh SSR), and Novosibirsk (Russian SFSR).

The country's roots lay in the October Revolution of 1917, which saw the Bolsheviks overthrow the Russian Provisional Government that formed earlier that year following the February Revolution and the abdication of Tsar Nicholas II, marking the end of the Russian Empire. Following the coup, the Bolsheviks, led by Vladimir Lenin, established the Russian Socialist Federative Soviet Republic (RSFSR), the world's first constitutionally guaranteed socialist state. Persisting internal tensions escalated into the brutal Russian Civil War. As the war progressed in the Bolsheviks' favor, the RSFSR began to incorporate land conquered in the war into nominally independent states, which were unified into the Soviet Union in December 1922. Following Lenin's death in 1924, Joseph Stalin came to power. Stalin inaugurated a period of rapid industrialization and forced collectivization that led to significant economic growth, but also contributed to a famine in 1930–1933 that killed millions. The labour camp system of the Gulag was also expanded in this period. Stalin conducted the Great Purge to remove his actual and perceived opponents. After the outbreak of World War II, Germany invaded the Soviet Union. The combined Soviet civilian and military casualty count—estimated to be around 27 million people—accounted for the majority of losses of Allied forces. In the aftermath of World War II, the territory taken by the Red Army formed various Soviet satellite states. The beginning of the Cold War saw the Eastern Bloc of the Soviet Union confront the Western Bloc of the United States, with the latter grouping becoming largely united in 1949 under NATO and the former grouping becoming largely united in 1955 under the Warsaw Pact. Following Stalin's death in 1953, a period known as de-Stalinization occurred under the leadership of Nikita Khrushchev. 

The Soviets took an early lead in the Space Race with the first artificial satellite, the first human spaceflight, and the first probe to land on another planet (Venus). In the 1970s, there was a brief détente in the Soviet Union's relationship with the United States, but tensions resumed following the Soviet invasion of Afghanistan in 1979. In the mid-1980s, the last Soviet leader, Mikhail Gorbachev, sought to reform the country through his policies of glasnost and perestroika.  In 1989, during the closing stages of the Cold War, various countries of the Warsaw Pact overthrew their Marxist–Leninist regimes, which was accompanied by the outbreak of strong nationalist and separatist movements across the entire Soviet Union. In 1991, Gorbachev initiated a national referendum—boycotted by the Soviet republics of Lithuania, Latvia, Estonia, Armenia, Georgia, and Moldova—that resulted in the majority of participating citizens voting in favour of preserving the country as a renewed federation. In August 1991, hardline members of the Communist Party staged a coup d'état against Gorbachev; the attempt failed, with Boris Yeltsin playing a high-profile role in facing down the unrest, and the Communist Party was subsequently banned. The Russian Federation became the Soviet Union's successor state, while all of the other republics emerged from the USSR's collapse as fully independent post-Soviet states.

The Soviet Union produced many significant social and technological achievements and innovations. It had the world's second-largest economy, and the Soviet Armed Forces comprised the largest standing military in the world. An NPT-designated state, it possessed the largest arsenal of nuclear weapons in the world. It was a founding member of the United Nations as well as one of the five permanent members of the United Nations Security Council. Before the dissolution, the country had maintained its status as one of the world's two superpowers through its hegemony in Eastern Europe, military and economic strength, and scientific research.

Etymology 

The word sovietnik means 'councillor'. Some organizations in Russian history were called council. In the Russian Empire, the State Council, which functioned from 1810 to 1917, was referred to as a Council of Ministers.

The Soviets as workers' councils first appeared during the Russian revolution of 1905. Although they were quickly suppressed by the imperial army, after the February revolution of 1917, workers' and soldiers' Soviets emerged throughout the country, and shared power with the Russian Provisional Government. The Bolsheviks, led by Vladimir Lenin, demanded that all power be transferred to the Soviets, and gained support from the workers and soldiers. After the October coup of 1917, where they seized power from the Provisional Government in the name of the Soviets, Lenin proclaimed the formation of the Russian Socialist Federal Soviet Republic (RSFSR).

During the Georgian Affair of 1922, Lenin called for the RSFSR and other national Soviet republics to form a greater union which he initially named as the Union of Soviet Republics of Europe and Asia. Joseph Stalin initially resisted Lenin's proposal but ultimately accepted it, and with Lenin's agreement he changed the name to the Union of Soviet Socialist Republics (USSR), although all republics began as socialist soviet and did not change to the other order until 1936. In addition, in the regional languages of several republics, the word council or conciliar in the respective language was only quite late changed to an adaptation of the Russian soviet and never in others, e.g. Ukrainian SSR.

 (in the Latin alphabet: SSSR) is the abbreviation of the Russian language cognate of USSR, as written in Cyrillic letters. The Soviets used this abbreviation so frequently that audiences worldwide became familiar with its meaning. In addition, the Russian short form name  (transliteration: , which literally means Soviet Union) is also commonly used, but only in its unabbreviated form. One apparent exception was the Russian abbreviation the Communist Party of the Soviet Union,  (KPSS).

In English language media, the state was referred to as the Soviet Union or the USSR. The Russian SFSR dominated the Soviet Union to such an extent that for most of the Soviet Union's existence, it was commonly, but incorrectly, referred to as Russia. Technically, Russia itself was only one republic within the larger union – albeit by far the largest, most powerful and most highly developed of the 15 republics. Nevertheless, according to historian Matthew White, it was an open secret that the country's federal structure was "window dressing" for Russian dominance. For that reason, the people of the USSR were almost always called "Russians", not "Soviets", since "everyone knew who really ran the show".

Geography 

It covered a sixth of Earth's land surface, and its size was comparable to the continent of North America. Its western part in Europe accounted for a quarter of the country's area and was the cultural and economic center. The eastern part in Asia extended to the Pacific Ocean to the east and Afghanistan to the south, and, except some areas in Central Asia, was much less populous. It had five climate zones: tundra, taiga, steppes, desert and mountains.

Two-thirds of it was a coastline. The country bordered (from 1945 to 1991): Norway, Finland, the Baltic Sea, Poland, Czechoslovakia, Hungary, Romania, the Black Sea, Turkey, Iran, the Caspian Sea, Afghanistan, China, Mongolia, and North Korea. The Bering Strait separated the country from the United States, while the La Pérouse Strait separated it from Japan.

It also included most of the world's largest lakes; the Caspian Sea (shared with Iran), and Lake Baikal in Russia, the world's largest and deepest freshwater lake.

History

Revolution and foundation (1917–1927) 

Modern revolutionary activity in the Russian Empire began with the 1825 Decembrist revolt. Although serfdom was abolished in 1861, it was done on terms unfavourable to the peasants and served to encourage revolutionaries. A parliament—the State Duma—was established in 1906 after the Russian Revolution of 1905, but Emperor Nicholas II resisted attempts to move from absolute to a constitutional monarchy. Social unrest continued and was aggravated during World War I by military defeat and food shortages in major cities.

A spontaneous popular demonstration in Petrograd on 8 March 1917, demanding peace and bread, culminated in the February Revolution and the toppling of Nicholas II and the imperial government. The tsarist autocracy was replaced by the Russian Provisional Government, which intended to conduct elections to the Russian Constituent Assembly and to continue fighting on the side of the Entente in World War I. At the same time, workers' councils, known in Russian as ‘Soviets’, sprang up across the country, and the most influential of them, the Petrograd Soviet of Workers' and Soldiers' Deputies, shared power with the Provisional Government. 

The Bolsheviks, led by Vladimir Lenin, pushed for socialist revolution in the Soviets and on the streets, adopting the slogan of “All Power to the Soviets” and urging the overthrow of the Provisional Government. On 7 November 1917, Bolshevik Red Guards stormed the Winter Palace in Petrograd, arresting the Provisional Government leaders and Lenin declared that all power was now transferred to the Soviets. This event would later be officially known in Soviet bibliographies as the "Great October Socialist Revolution". The bloody Red Terror was initiated to shut down all opposition, both perceived and real. In December, the Bolsheviks signed an armistice with the Central Powers, though by February 1918, fighting had resumed. In March, the Soviets ended involvement in the war and signed the Treaty of Brest-Litovsk.

A long and bloody Civil War ensued between the Reds and the Whites, starting in 1917 and ending in 1923 with the Reds' victory. It included foreign intervention, the execution of the former Emperor and his family, and the famine of 1921, which killed about five million people. In March 1921, during a related war with Poland, the Peace of Riga was signed, splitting disputed territories in Belarus and Ukraine between the Republic of Poland and Soviet Russia. Soviet Russia sought to re-conquer all newly independent nations of the former Empire, although their success was limited. Estonia, Finland, Latvia, and Lithuania all repelled Soviet invasions, while Ukraine, Belarus (as a result of the Polish–Soviet War), Armenia, Azerbaijan and Georgia were occupied by the Red Army.

Treaty on the Creation of the USSR 
On 28 December 1922, a conference of plenipotentiary delegations from the Russian SFSR, the Transcaucasian SFSR, the Ukrainian SSR and the Byelorussian SSR approved the Treaty on the Creation of the USSR and the Declaration of the Creation of the USSR, forming the Union of Soviet Socialist Republics. These two documents were confirmed by the first Congress of Soviets of the USSR and signed by the heads of the delegations, Mikhail Kalinin, Mikhail Tskhakaya, Mikhail Frunze, Grigory Petrovsky and Alexander Chervyakov, on 30 December 1922. The formal proclamation was made from the stage of the Bolshoi Theatre in Moscow.

An intensive restructuring of the economy, industry and politics of the country began in the early days of Soviet power in 1917. A large part of this was done according to the Bolshevik Initial Decrees, government documents signed by Vladimir Lenin. One of the most prominent breakthroughs was the GOELRO plan, which envisioned a major restructuring of the Soviet economy based on total electrification of the country. The plan became the prototype for subsequent Five-Year Plans and was fulfilled by 1931. After the economic policy of ‘War communism’ during the Russian Civil War, as a prelude to fully developing socialism in the country, the Soviet government permitted some private enterprise to coexist alongside nationalized industry in the 1920s, and total food requisition in the countryside was replaced by a food tax.

From its creation, the government in the Soviet Union was based on the one-party rule of the Communist Party (Bolsheviks). The stated purpose was to prevent the return of capitalist exploitation, and that the principles of democratic centralism would be the most effective in representing the people's will in a practical manner. The debate over the future of the economy provided the background for a power struggle in the years after Lenin's death in 1924. Initially, Lenin was to be replaced by a ‘troika’ consisting of Grigory Zinoviev of the Ukrainian SSR, Lev Kamenev of the Russian SFSR, and Joseph Stalin of the Transcaucasian SFSR.

On 1 February 1924, the USSR was recognized by the United Kingdom. The same year, a Soviet Constitution was approved, legitimizing the December 1922 union.

According to Archie Brown the constitution was never an accurate guide to political reality in the USSR. For example the fact that the Party played the leading role in making and enforcing policy was not mentioned in it until 1977. The USSR was a federative entity of many constituent republics, each with its own political and administrative entities. However, the term ‘Soviet Russia’formally applicable only to the Russian Federative Socialist Republicwas often applied to the entire country by non-Soviet writers due to its domination by the Russian SFSR.

Stalin era (1927–1953) 

On 3 April 1922, Stalin was named the General Secretary of the Communist Party of the Soviet Union. Lenin had appointed Stalin the head of the Workers' and Peasants' Inspectorate, which gave Stalin considerable power. By gradually consolidating his influence and isolating and outmaneuvering his rivals within the party, Stalin became the undisputed leader of the country and, by the end of the 1920s, established a totalitarian rule. In October 1927, Zinoviev and Leon Trotsky were expelled from the Central Committee and forced into exile.

In 1928, Stalin introduced the first five-year plan for building a socialist economy. In place of the internationalism expressed by Lenin throughout the Revolution, it aimed to build Socialism in One Country. In industry, the state assumed control over all existing enterprises and undertook an intensive program of industrialization. In agriculture, rather than adhering to the ‘lead by example’ policy advocated by Lenin, forced collectivization of farms was implemented all over the country.

Famines ensued as a result, causing deaths estimated at three to seven million; surviving kulaks were persecuted, and many were sent to Gulags to do forced labor. Social upheaval continued in the mid-1930s. Despite the turmoil of the mid-to-late 1930s, the country developed a robust industrial economy in the years preceding World War II.

Closer cooperation between the USSR and the West developed in the early 1930s. From 1932 to 1934, the country participated in the World Disarmament Conference. In 1933, diplomatic relations between the United States and the USSR were established when in November, the newly elected President of the United States, Franklin D. Roosevelt, chose to recognize Stalin's Communist government formally and negotiated a new trade agreement between the two countries. In September 1934, the country joined the League of Nations. After the Spanish Civil War broke out in 1936, the USSR actively supported the Republican forces against the Nationalists, who were supported by Fascist Italy and Nazi Germany.

In December 1936, Stalin unveiled a new constitution that was praised by supporters around the world as the most democratic constitution imaginable, though there was some skepticism. Stalin's Great Purge resulted in the detainment or execution of many ‘Old Bolsheviks’ who had participated in the October Revolution with Lenin. According to declassified Soviet archives, the NKVD arrested more than one and a half million people in 1937 and 1938, of whom 681,692 were shot. Over those two years, there were an average of over one thousand executions a day.

In 1939, after attempts to form a military alliance with Britain and France against Germany failed, the Soviet Union made a dramatic shift towards Nazi Germany. Almost a year after Britain and France had concluded the Munich Agreement with Germany, the Soviet Union made agreements with Germany as well, both militarily and economically during extensive talks. The two countries concluded the Molotov–Ribbentrop Pact and the on 23 August 1939. The former made possible the Soviet occupation of Lithuania, Latvia, Estonia, Bessarabia, northern Bukovina, and eastern Poland.

On 1 September, Germany invaded Poland and on the 17th the Soviet Union invaded Poland as well. On 6 October, Poland fell and part of the Soviet occupation zone was then handed over to Germany.

On 10 October, the Soviet Union and Lithuania signed an agreement whereby the Soviet Union transferred Polish sovereignty over the Vilna region to Lithuania, and on 28 October the boundary between the Soviet occupation zone and the new territory of Lithuania was officially demarcated.

On 1 November, the Soviet Union annexed Western Ukraine, followed by Western Belarus on the 2nd.

In late November, unable to coerce the Republic of Finland by diplomatic means into moving its border  back from Leningrad, Stalin ordered the invasion of Finland. On 14 December 1939, the Soviet Union was expelled from the League of Nations for invading Finland. In the east, the Soviet military won several decisive victories during border clashes with the Empire of Japan in 1938 and 1939. However, in April 1941, the USSR signed the Soviet–Japanese Neutrality Pact with Japan, recognizing the territorial integrity of Manchukuo, a Japanese puppet state.

World War II 

Germany broke the Molotov–Ribbentrop Pact and invaded the Soviet Union on 22 June 1941 starting what was known in the USSR as the Great Patriotic War. The Red Army stopped the seemingly invincible German Army at the Battle of Moscow. The Battle of Stalingrad, which lasted from late 1942 to early 1943, dealt a severe blow to Germany from which they never fully recovered and became a turning point in the war. After Stalingrad, Soviet forces drove through Eastern Europe to Berlin before Germany surrendered in 1945. The German Army suffered 80% of its military deaths in the Eastern Front. Harry Hopkins, a close foreign policy advisor to Franklin D. Roosevelt, spoke on 10 August 1943 of the USSR's decisive role in the war.

In the same year, the USSR, in fulfilment of its agreement with the Allies at the Yalta Conference, denounced the Soviet–Japanese Neutrality Pact in April 1945 and invaded Manchukuo and other Japan-controlled territories on 9 August 1945. This conflict ended with a decisive Soviet victory, contributing to the unconditional surrender of Japan and the end of World War II.

The USSR suffered greatly in the war, losing around 27 million people. Approximately 2.8 million Soviet POWs died of starvation, mistreatment, or executions in just eight months of 1941–42. During the war, the country together with the United States, the United Kingdom and China were considered the Big Four Allied powers, and later became the Four Policemen that formed the basis of the United Nations Security Council. It emerged as a superpower in the post-war period. Once denied diplomatic recognition by the Western world, the USSR had official relations with practically every country by the late 1940s. A member of the United Nations at its foundation in 1945, the country became one of the five permanent members of the United Nations Security Council, which gave it the right to veto any of its resolutions.

Cold War 

During the immediate post-war period, the Soviet Union rebuilt and expanded its economy, while maintaining its strictly centralized control. It took effective control over most of the countries of Eastern Europe (except Yugoslavia and later Albania), turning them into satellite states. The USSR bound its satellite states in a military alliance, the Warsaw Pact, in 1955, and an economic organization, Council for Mutual Economic Assistance or Comecon, a counterpart to the European Economic Community (EEC), from 1949 to 1991. The USSR concentrated on its own recovery, seizing and transferring most of Germany's industrial plants, and it exacted war reparations from East Germany, Hungary, Romania, and Bulgaria using Soviet-dominated joint enterprises. It also instituted trading arrangements deliberately designed to favour the country. Moscow controlled the Communist parties that ruled the satellite states, and they followed orders from the Kremlin. Later, the Comecon supplied aid to the eventually victorious Chinese Communist Party, and its influence grew elsewhere in the world. Fearing its ambitions, the Soviet Union's wartime allies, the United Kingdom and the United States, became its rivals. In the ensuing Cold War, the two sides clashed indirectly in several proxy wars.

De-Stalinization and Khrushchev Thaw (1953–1964) 

Stalin died on 5 March 1953. Without a mutually agreeable successor, the highest Communist Party officials initially opted to rule the Soviet Union jointly through a troika headed by Georgy Malenkov. This did not last, however, and Nikita Khrushchev eventually won the ensuing power struggle by the mid-1950s. In 1956, he denounced Joseph Stalin and proceeded to ease controls over the party and society. This was known as de-Stalinization.

Moscow considered Eastern Europe to be a critically vital buffer zone for the forward defence of its western borders, in case of another major invasion such as the German invasion of 1941. For this reason, the USSR sought to cement its control of the region by transforming the Eastern European countries into satellite states, dependent upon and subservient to its leadership. As a result, Soviet military forces were used to suppress an anti-communist uprising in Hungary in 1956.

In the late 1950s, a confrontation with China regarding the Soviet rapprochement with the West, and what Mao Zedong perceived as Khrushchev's revisionism, led to the Sino–Soviet split. This resulted in a break throughout the global Marxist–Leninist movement, with the governments in Albania, Cambodia and Somalia choosing to ally with China.

During this period of the late 1950s and early 1960s, the USSR continued to realize scientific and technological exploits in the Space Race, rivaling the United States: launching the first artificial satellite, Sputnik 1 in 1957; a living dog named Laika in 1957; the first human being, Yuri Gagarin in 1961; the first woman in space, Valentina Tereshkova in 1963; Alexei Leonov, the first person to walk in space in 1965; the first soft landing on the Moon by spacecraft Luna 9 in 1966; and the first Moon rovers, Lunokhod 1 and Lunokhod 2.

Khrushchev initiated ‘The Thaw’, a complex shift in political, cultural and economic life in the country. This included some openness and contact with other nations and new social and economic policies with more emphasis on commodity goods, allowing a dramatic rise in living standards while maintaining high levels of economic growth. Censorship was relaxed as well. Khrushchev's reforms in agriculture and administration, however, were generally unproductive. In 1962, he precipitated a crisis with the United States over the Soviet deployment of nuclear missiles in Cuba. An agreement was made with the United States to remove nuclear missiles from both Cuba and Turkey, concluding the crisis. This event caused Khrushchev much embarrassment and loss of prestige, resulting in his removal from power in 1964.

Era of Stagnation (1964–1985) 

Following the ousting of Khrushchev, another period of collective leadership ensued, consisting of Leonid Brezhnev as general secretary, Alexei Kosygin as Premier and Nikolai Podgorny as Chairman of the Presidium, lasting until Brezhnev established himself in the early 1970s as the preeminent Soviet leader.

In 1968, the Soviet Union and Warsaw Pact allies invaded Czechoslovakia to halt the Prague Spring reforms. In the aftermath, Brezhnev justified the invasion and previous military interventions as well as any potential military interventions in the future by introducing the Brezhnev Doctrine, which proclaimed any threat to socialist rule in a Warsaw Pact state as a threat to all Warsaw Pact states, therefore justifying military intervention.

Brezhnev presided throughout détente with the West that resulted in treaties on armament control (SALT I, SALT II, Anti-Ballistic Missile Treaty) while at the same time building up Soviet military might.

In October 1977, the third Soviet Constitution was unanimously adopted. The prevailing mood of the Soviet leadership at the time of Brezhnev's death in 1982 was one of aversion to change. The long period of Brezhnev's rule had come to be dubbed one of ‘standstill’, with an ageing and ossified top political leadership. This period is also known as the Era of Stagnation, a period of adverse economic, political, and social effects in the country, which began during the rule of Brezhnev and continued under his successors Yuri Andropov and Konstantin Chernenko.

In late 1979, the Soviet Union's military intervened in the ongoing civil war in neighboring Afghanistan, effectively ending a détente with the West.

Perestroika and Glasnost reforms (1985–1991) 

Two developments dominated the decade that followed: the increasingly apparent crumbling of the Soviet Union's economic and political structures, and the patchwork attempts at reforms to reverse that process. Kenneth S. Deffeyes argued in Beyond Oil that the Reagan administration encouraged Saudi Arabia to lower the price of oil to the point where the Soviets could not make a profit selling their oil, and resulted in the depletion of the country's hard currency reserves.

Brezhnev's next two successors, transitional figures with deep roots in his tradition, did not last long. Yuri Andropov was 68 years old and Konstantin Chernenko 72 when they assumed power; both died in less than two years. In an attempt to avoid a third short-lived leader, in 1985, the Soviets turned to the next generation and selected Mikhail Gorbachev. He made significant changes in the economy and party leadership, called perestroika. His policy of glasnost freed public access to information after decades of heavy government censorship. Gorbachev also moved to end the Cold War. In 1988, the USSR abandoned its war in Afghanistan and began to withdraw its forces. In the following year, Gorbachev refused to interfere in the internal affairs of the Soviet satellite states, which paved the way for the Revolutions of 1989. In particular, the standstill of the Soviet Union at the Pan-European Picnic in August 1989 then set a peaceful chain reaction in motion at the end of which the Eastern Bloc collapsed. With the tearing down of the Berlin Wall and with East and West Germany pursuing unification, the Iron Curtain between the West and Soviet-controlled regions came down.

At the same time, the Soviet republics started legal moves towards potentially declaring sovereignty over their territories, citing the freedom to secede in Article 72 of the USSR constitution. On 7 April 1990, a law was passed allowing a republic to secede if more than two-thirds of its residents voted for it in a referendum. Many held their first free elections in the Soviet era for their own national legislatures in 1990. Many of these legislatures proceeded to produce legislation contradicting the Union laws in what was known as the ‘War of Laws’. In 1989, the Russian SFSR convened a newly elected Congress of People's Deputies. Boris Yeltsin was elected its chairman. On 12 June 1990, the Congress declared Russia's sovereignty over its territory and proceeded to pass laws that attempted to supersede some of the Soviet laws. After a landslide victory of Sąjūdis in Lithuania, that country declared its independence restored on 11 March 1990.

A referendum for the preservation of the USSR was held on 17 March 1991 in nine republics (the remainder having boycotted the vote), with the majority of the population in those republics voting for preservation of the Union. The referendum gave Gorbachev a minor boost. In the summer of 1991, the New Union Treaty, which would have turned the country into a much looser Union, was agreed upon by eight republics. The signing of the treaty, however, was interrupted by the August Coup—an attempted coup d'état by hardline members of the government and the KGB who sought to reverse Gorbachev's reforms and reassert the central government's control over the republics. After the coup collapsed, Yeltsin was seen as a hero for his decisive actions, while Gorbachev's power was effectively ended. The balance of power tipped significantly towards the republics. In August 1991, Latvia and Estonia immediately declared the restoration of their full independence (following Lithuania's 1990 example). Gorbachev resigned as general secretary in late August, and soon afterwards, the party's activities were indefinitely suspended—effectively ending its rule. By the fall, Gorbachev could no longer influence events outside Moscow, and he was being challenged even there by Yeltsin, who had been elected President of Russia in July 1991.

Dissolution and aftermath 

The remaining 12 republics continued discussing new, increasingly looser, models of the Union. However, by December all except Russia and Kazakhstan had formally declared independence. During this time, Yeltsin took over what remained of the Soviet government, including the Moscow Kremlin. The final blow was struck on 1 December when Ukraine, the second-most powerful republic, voted overwhelmingly for independence. Ukraine's secession ended any realistic chance of the country staying together even on a limited scale.

On 8 December 1991, the presidents of Russia, Ukraine and Belarus (formerly Byelorussia), signed the Belavezha Accords, which declared the Soviet Union dissolved and established the Commonwealth of Independent States (CIS) in its place. While doubts remained over the authority of the accords to do this, on 21 December 1991, the representatives of all Soviet republics except Georgia signed the Alma-Ata Protocol, which confirmed the accords. On 25 December 1991, Gorbachev resigned as the President of the USSR, declaring the office extinct. He turned the powers that had been vested in the presidency over to Yeltsin. That night, the Soviet flag was lowered for the last time, and the Russian tricolour was raised in its place.

The following day, the Supreme Soviet, the highest governmental body, voted both itself and the country out of existence. This is generally recognized as marking the official, final dissolution of the Soviet Union as a functioning state, and the end of the Cold War. The Soviet Army initially remained under overall CIS command but was soon absorbed into the different military forces of the newly independent states. The few remaining Soviet institutions that had not been taken over by Russia ceased to function by the end of 1991.

Following the dissolution, Russia was internationally recognized as the USSR's legal successor on the international stage. To that end, Russia voluntarily accepted all Soviet foreign debt and claimed Soviet overseas properties as its own. Under the 1992 Lisbon Protocol, Russia also agreed to receive all nuclear weapons remaining in the territory of other former Soviet republics. Since then, the Russian Federation has assumed the Soviet Union's rights and obligations. Ukraine has refused to recognize exclusive Russian claims to succession of the USSR and claimed such status for Ukraine as well, which was codified in Articles 7 and 8 of its 1991 law On Legal Succession of Ukraine. Since its independence in 1991, Ukraine has continued to pursue claims against Russia in foreign courts, seeking to recover its share of the foreign property that was owned by the USSR.

The dissolution was followed by a severe drop in economic and social conditions in post-Soviet states, including a rapid increase in poverty, crime, corruption, unemployment, homelessness, rates of disease, infant mortality and domestic violence, as well as demographic losses, income inequality and the rise of an oligarchical class, along with decreases in calorie intake, life expectancy, adult literacy, and income. Between 1988 and 1989 and 1993–1995, the Gini ratio increased by an average of 9 points for all former socialist countries. The economic shocks that accompanied wholesale privatization were associated with sharp increases in mortality. Data shows Russia, Kazakhstan, Latvia, Lithuania and Estonia saw a tripling of unemployment and a 42% increase in male death rates between 1991 and 1994. In the following decades, only five or six of the post-communist states are on a path to joining the wealthy capitalist West while most are falling behind, some to such an extent that it will take over fifty years to catch up to where they were before the fall of the Soviet Bloc.

In summing up the international ramifications of these events, Vladislav Zubok stated: ‘The collapse of the Soviet empire was an event of epochal geopolitical, military, ideological, and economic significance.’ Before the dissolution, the country had maintained its status as one of the world's two superpowers for four decades after World War II through its hegemony in Eastern Europe, military strength, economic strength and scientific research, especially in space technology and weaponry.

Post-Soviet states 

The analysis of the succession of states for the 15 post-Soviet states is complex. The Russian Federation is seen as the legal continuator state and is for most purposes the heir to the Soviet Union. It retained ownership of all former Soviet embassy properties, and also inherited the Soviet Union's UN membership, with its permanent seat on the Security Council.

Of the two other co-founding states of the USSR at the time of the dissolution, Ukraine was the only one that had passed laws, similar to Russia, that it is a state-successor of both the Ukrainian SSR and the USSR. Soviet treaties laid groundwork for Ukraine's future foreign agreements as well as leading to the country agreeing to undertake 16.37% of debts of the Soviet Union for which it was going to receive its share of the USSR's foreign property. Russia's position as the 'only continuation of the USSR' that became widely accepted in the West, as well as constant pressure from the Western countries, allowed Russia to dispose state property of USSR abroad and conceal information about it. Due to that Ukraine never ratified 'zero option' agreement that Russian Federation had signed with other former Soviet republics, as it denied disclosing of information about Soviet Gold Reserves and its Diamond Fund. The dispute over former Soviet property and assets between the two former republics is still ongoing:

Similar situation occurred with restitution of cultural property. Although on 14 February 1992 Russia and other former Soviet republics signed agreement 'On the return of cultural and historic property to the origin states' in Minsk, it was halted by the Russian State Duma that eventually passed 'Federal Law on Cultural Valuables Displaced to the USSR as a Result of the Second World War and Located on the Territory of the Russian Federation' which made restitution currently impossible.

Estonia, Latvia, and Lithuania consider themselves as revivals of the three independent countries that existed prior to their occupation and annexation by the Soviet Union in 1940. They maintain that the process by which they were incorporated into the Soviet Union violated both international law and their own law, and that in 1990–1991 they were reasserting an independence that still legally existed.

There are additionally six states that claim independence from the other internationally recognized post-Soviet states but possess limited international recognition: Abkhazia, Artsakh, Donetsk, Luhansk, South Ossetia and Transnistria. The Chechen separatist movement of the Chechen Republic of Ichkeria, the Gagauz separatist movement of the Gagauz Republic and the Talysh separatist movement of the Talysh-Mughan Autonomous Republic lack any international recognition.

Foreign relations 

During his rule, Stalin always made the final policy decisions. Otherwise, Soviet foreign policy was set by the commission on the Foreign Policy of the Central Committee of the Communist Party of the Soviet Union, or by the party's highest body the Politburo. Operations were handled by the separate Ministry of Foreign Affairs. It was known as the People's Commissariat for Foreign Affairs (or Narkomindel), until 1946. The most influential spokesmen were Georgy Chicherin (1872–1936), Maxim Litvinov (1876–1951), Vyacheslav Molotov (1890–1986), Andrey Vyshinsky (1883–1954) and Andrei Gromyko (1909–1989). Intellectuals were based in the Moscow State Institute of International Relations.
 Comintern (1919–1943), or Communist International, was an international communist organization based in the Kremlin that advocated world communism. The Comintern intended to ‘struggle by all available means, including armed force, for the overthrow of the international bourgeoisie and the creation of an international Soviet republic as a transition stage to the complete abolition of the state’. It was abolished as a conciliatory measure toward Britain and the United States.
 Comecon, the Council for Mutual Economic Assistance (Russian: Совет Экономической Взаимопомощи, Sovet Ekonomicheskoy Vzaimopomoshchi, СЭВ, SEV) was an economic organization from 1949 to 1991 under Soviet control that comprised the countries of the Eastern Bloc along with several communist states elsewhere in the world. Moscow was concerned about the Marshall Plan, and Comecon was meant to prevent countries in the Soviets' sphere of influence from moving towards that of the Americans and Southeast Asia. Comecon was the Eastern Bloc's reply to the formation in Western Europe of the Organization for European Economic Co-Operation (OEEC),
 The Warsaw Pact was a collective defence alliance formed in 1955 among the USSR and its satellite states in Eastern Europe during the Cold War. The Warsaw Pact was the military complement to the Comecon, the regional economic organization for the socialist states of Central and Eastern Europe. The Warsaw Pact was created in reaction to the integration of West Germany into NATO.
 The Cominform (1947–1956), informally the Communist Information Bureau and officially the Information Bureau of the Communist and Workers' Parties, was the first official agency of the international Marxist-Leninist movement since the dissolution of the Comintern in 1943. Its role was to coordinate actions between Marxist-Leninist parties under Soviet direction. Stalin used it to order Western European communist parties to abandon their exclusively parliamentarian line and instead concentrate on politically impeding the operations of the Marshall Plan. It also coordinated international aid to Marxist-Leninist insurgents during the Greek Civil War in 1947–1949. It expelled Yugoslavia in 1948 after Josip Broz Tito insisted on an independent program. Its newspaper, For a Lasting Peace, for a People's Democracy!, promoted Stalin's positions. The Cominform's concentration on Europe meant a deemphasis on world revolution in Soviet foreign policy. By enunciating a uniform ideology, it allowed the constituent parties to focus on personalities rather than issues.

Early policies (1919–1939) 

The Marxist-Leninist leadership of the Soviet Union intensely debated foreign policy issues and changed directions several times. Even after Stalin assumed dictatorial control in the late 1920s, there were debates, and he frequently changed positions.

During the country's early period, it was assumed that Communist revolutions would break out soon in every major industrial country, and it was the Soviet responsibility to assist them. The Comintern was the weapon of choice. A few revolutions did break out, but they were quickly suppressed (the longest lasting one was in Hungary)—the Hungarian Soviet Republic—lasted only from 21 March 1919 to 1 August 1919. The Russian Bolsheviks were in no position to give any help.

By 1921, Lenin, Trotsky, and Stalin realized that capitalism had stabilized itself in Europe and there would not be any widespread revolutions anytime soon. It became the duty of the Russian Bolsheviks to protect what they had in Russia, and avoid military confrontations that might destroy their bridgehead. Russia was now a pariah state, along with Germany. The two came to terms in 1922 with the Treaty of Rapallo that settled long-standing grievances. At the same time, the two countries secretly set up training programs for the illegal German army and air force operations at hidden camps in the USSR.

Moscow eventually stopped threatening other states, and instead worked to open peaceful relationships in terms of trade, and diplomatic recognition. The United Kingdom dismissed the warnings of Winston Churchill and a few others about a continuing Marxist-Leninist threat, and opened trade relations and de facto diplomatic recognition in 1922. There was hope for a settlement of the pre-war Tsarist debts, but it was repeatedly postponed. Formal recognition came when the new Labour Party came to power in 1924. All the other countries followed suit in opening trade relations. Henry Ford opened large-scale business relations with the Soviets in the late 1920s, hoping that it would lead to long-term peace. Finally, in 1933, the United States officially recognized the USSR, a decision backed by the public opinion and especially by US business interests that expected an opening of a new profitable market.

In the late 1920s and early 1930s, Stalin ordered Marxist-Leninist parties across the world to strongly oppose non-Marxist political parties, labor unions or other organizations on the left. Stalin reversed himself in 1934 with the Popular Front program that called on all Marxist parties to join with all anti-Fascist political, labor, and organizational forces that were opposed to fascism, especially of the Nazi variety.

In 1939, half a year after the Munich Agreement, the USSR attempted to form an anti-Nazi alliance with France and Britain. Adolf Hitler proposed a better deal, which would give the USSR control over much of Eastern Europe through the Molotov–Ribbentrop Pact. In September, Germany invaded Poland, and the USSR also invaded later that month, resulting in the partition of Poland. In response, Britain and France declared war on Germany, marking the beginning of World War II.

World War II (1939–1945) 
Up until his death in 1953, Joseph Stalin controlled all foreign relations of the Soviet Union during the interwar period. Despite the increasing build-up of Germany's war machine and the outbreak of the Second Sino-Japanese War, the Soviet Union did not cooperate with any other nation, choosing to follow its own path. However, after Operation Barbarossa, the Soviet Union's priorities changed. Despite previous conflict with the United Kingdom, Vyacheslav Molotov dropped his post war border demands.

Cold War (1945–1991) 
The Cold War was a period of geopolitical tension between the United States and the Soviet Union and their respective allies, the Western Bloc and the Eastern Bloc, which began following World War II in 1945. The term cold war is used because there was no large-scale fighting directly between the two superpowers, but they each supported major regional conflicts known as proxy wars. The conflict was based around the ideological and geopolitical struggle for global influence by these two superpowers, following their temporary alliance and victory against Nazi Germany in 1945. Aside from the nuclear arsenal development and conventional military deployment, the struggle for dominance was expressed via indirect means such as psychological warfare, propaganda campaigns, espionage, far-reaching embargoes, rivalry at sports events and technological competitions such as the Space Race.

Politics 

There were three power hierarchies in the Soviet Union: the legislature represented by the Supreme Soviet of the Soviet Union, the government represented by the Council of Ministers, and the Communist Party of the Soviet Union (CPSU), the only legal party and the final policymaker in the country.

Communist Party 

At the top of the Communist Party was the Central Committee, elected at Party Congresses and Conferences. In turn, the Central Committee voted for a Politburo (called the Presidium between 1952 and 1966), Secretariat and the general secretary (First Secretary from 1953 to 1966), the de facto highest office in the Soviet Union. Depending on the degree of power consolidation, it was either the Politburo as a collective body or the General Secretary, who always was one of the Politburo members, that effectively led the party and the country (except for the period of the highly personalized authority of Stalin, exercised directly through his position in the Council of Ministers rather than the Politburo after 1941). They were not controlled by the general party membership, as the key principle of the party organization was democratic centralism, demanding strict subordination to higher bodies, and elections went uncontested, endorsing the candidates proposed from above.

The Communist Party maintained its dominance over the state mainly through its control over the system of appointments. All senior government officials and most deputies of the Supreme Soviet were members of the CPSU. Of the party heads themselves, Stalin (1941–1953) and Khrushchev (1958–1964) were Premiers. Upon the forced retirement of Khrushchev, the party leader was prohibited from this kind of double membership, but the later General Secretaries for at least some part of their tenure occupied the mostly ceremonial position of Chairman of the Presidium of the Supreme Soviet, the nominal head of state. The institutions at lower levels were overseen and at times supplanted by primary party organizations.

However, in practice the degree of control the party was able to exercise over the state bureaucracy, particularly after the death of Stalin, was far from total, with the bureaucracy pursuing different interests that were at times in conflict with the party. Nor was the party itself monolithic from top to bottom, although factions were officially banned.

Government 

The Supreme Soviet (successor of the Congress of Soviets) was nominally the highest state body for most of the Soviet history, at first acting as a rubber stamp institution, approving and implementing all decisions made by the party. However, its powers and functions were extended in the late 1950s, 1960s and 1970s, including the creation of new state commissions and committees. It gained additional powers relating to the approval of the Five-Year Plans and the government budget. The Supreme Soviet elected a Presidium (successor of the Central Executive Committee) to wield its power between plenary sessions, ordinarily held twice a year, and appointed the Supreme Court, the Procurator General and the Council of Ministers (known before 1946 as the Council of People's Commissars), headed by the Chairman (Premier) and managing an enormous bureaucracy responsible for the administration of the economy and society. State and party structures of the constituent republics largely emulated the structure of the central institutions, although the Russian SFSR, unlike the other constituent republics, for most of its history had no republican branch of the CPSU, being ruled directly by the union-wide party until 1990. Local authorities were organized likewise into party committees, local Soviets and executive committees. While the state system was nominally federal, the party was unitary.

The state security police (the KGB and its predecessor agencies) played an important role in Soviet politics. It was instrumental in the Great Purge, but was brought under strict party control after Stalin's death. Under Yuri Andropov, the KGB engaged in the suppression of political dissent and maintained an extensive network of informers, reasserting itself as a political actor to some extent independent of the party-state structure, culminating in the anti-corruption campaign targeting high-ranking party officials in the late 1970s and early 1980s.

Separation of power and reform 

The constitution, which was promulgated in 1924, 1936 and 1977, did not limit state power. No formal separation of powers existed between the Party, Supreme Soviet and Council of Ministers that represented executive and legislative branches of the government. The system was governed less by statute than by informal conventions, and no settled mechanism of leadership succession existed. Bitter and at times deadly power struggles took place in the Politburo after the deaths of Lenin and Stalin, as well as after Khrushchev's dismissal, itself due to a decision by both the Politburo and the Central Committee. All leaders of the Communist Party before Gorbachev died in office, except Georgy Malenkov and Khrushchev, both dismissed from the party leadership amid internal struggle within the party.

Between 1988 and 1990, facing considerable opposition, Mikhail Gorbachev enacted reforms shifting power away from the highest bodies of the party and making the Supreme Soviet less dependent on them. The Congress of People's Deputies was established, the majority of whose members were directly elected in competitive elections held in March 1989. The Congress now elected the Supreme Soviet, which became a full-time parliament, and much stronger than before. For the first time since the 1920s, it refused to rubber stamp proposals from the party and Council of Ministers. In 1990, Gorbachev introduced and assumed the position of the President of the Soviet Union, concentrated power in his executive office, independent of the party, and subordinated the government, now renamed the Cabinet of Ministers of the USSR, to himself.

Tensions grew between the Union-wide authorities under Gorbachev, reformists led in Russia by Boris Yeltsin and controlling the newly elected Supreme Soviet of the Russian SFSR, and communist hardliners. On 19–21 August 1991, a group of hardliners staged a coup attempt. The coup failed, and the State Council of the Soviet Union became the highest organ of state power ‘in the period of transition’. Gorbachev resigned as General Secretary, only remaining President for the final months of the existence of the USSR.

Judicial system 

The judiciary was not independent of the other branches of government. The Supreme Court supervised the lower courts (People's Court) and applied the law as established by the constitution or as interpreted by the Supreme Soviet. The Constitutional Oversight Committee reviewed the constitutionality of laws and acts. The Soviet Union used the inquisitorial system of Roman law, where the judge, procurator, and defence attorney collaborate to establish the truth.

Administrative divisions 

Constitutionally, the USSR was a federation of constituent Union Republics, which were either unitary states, such as Ukraine or Byelorussia (SSRs), or federations, such as Russia or Transcaucasia (SFSRs), all four being the founding republics who signed the Treaty on the Creation of the USSR in December 1922. In 1924, during the national delimitation in Central Asia, Uzbekistan and Turkmenistan were formed from parts of Russia's Turkestan ASSR and two Soviet dependencies, the Khorezm and Bukharan SSRs. In 1929, Tajikistan was split off from the Uzbekistan SSR. With the constitution of 1936, the Transcaucasian SFSR was dissolved, resulting in its constituent republics of Armenia, Georgia and Azerbaijan being elevated to Union Republics, while Kazakhstan and Kirghizia were split off from Russian SFSR, resulting in the same status. In August 1940, Moldavia was formed from parts of Ukraine and Bessarabia and Ukrainian SSR. Estonia, Latvia and Lithuania (SSRs) were also admitted into the union which was not recognized by most of the international community and was considered an illegal occupation. Karelia was split off from Russia as a Union Republic in March 1940 and was reabsorbed in 1956. Between July 1956 and September 1991, there were 15 union republics (see map below).

While nominally a union of equals, in practice the Soviet Union was dominated by Russians. The domination was so absolute that for most of its existence, the country was commonly (but incorrectly) referred to as ‘Russia’. While the RSFSR was technically only one republic within the larger union, it was by far the largest (both in terms of population and area), most powerful, and most highly developed. The RSFSR was also the industrial center of the Soviet Union. Historian Matthew White wrote that it was an open secret that the country's federal structure was ‘window dressing’ for Russian dominance. For that reason, the people of the USSR were usually called ‘Russians’, not ‘Soviets’, since ‘everyone knew who really ran the show’.

Military 

Under the Military Law of September 1925, the Soviet Armed Forces consisted of the Land Forces, the Air Force, the Navy, Joint State Political Directorate (OGPU), and the Internal Troops. The OGPU later became independent and in 1934 joined the NKVD, and so its internal troops were under the joint leadership of the defense and internal commissariats. After World War II, Strategic Missile Forces (1959), Air Defense Forces (1948) and National Civil Defense Forces (1970) were formed, which ranked first, third, and sixth in the official Soviet system of importance (ground forces were second, Air Force Fourth, and Navy Fifth).

The army had the greatest political influence. In 1989, there served two million soldiers divided between 150 motorized and 52 armored divisions. Until the early 1960s, the Soviet navy was a rather small military branch, but after the Caribbean crisis, under the leadership of Sergei Gorshkov, it expanded significantly. It became known for battlecruisers and submarines. In 1989 there served 500 000 men. The Soviet Air Force focused on a fleet of strategic bombers and during war situation was to eradicate enemy infrastructure and nuclear capacity. The air force also had a number of fighters and tactical bombers to support the army in the war. Strategic missile forces had more than 1,400 intercontinental ballistic missiles (ICBMs), deployed between 28 bases and 300 command centers.

In the post-war period, the Soviet Army was directly involved in several military operations abroad. These included the suppression of the uprising in East Germany (1953), Hungarian revolution (1956) and the invasion of Czechoslovakia (1968). The Soviet Union also participated in the war in Afghanistan between 1979 and 1989.

In the Soviet Union, general conscription applied, meaning all able-bodied males aged 18 and older were drafted in the armed forces.

Space program 

At the end of the 1950s, the USSR constructed the first satellite – Sputnik 1, which marked the beginning of the Space Race, a competition to achieve superior spaceflight capability with the United States. This was followed by other successful satellites, most notably Sputnik 5, where test dogs were sent to space. On 12 April 1961, the USSR launched Vostok 1, which carried Yuri Gagarin, making him the first human to ever be launched into space and complete a space journey. At that time, the first plans for space shuttles and orbital stations were drawn up in Soviet design offices, but in the end personal disputes between designers and management prevented this.

As for Lunar space program; USSR only had a program on automated spacecraft launches; with no crewed spacecraft used; passing on the ‘Moon Race’ part of Space Race.

In the 1970s, specific proposals for the design of the space shuttle began to emerge, but shortcomings, especially in the electronics industry (rapid overheating of electronics), postponed the program until the end of the 1980s. The first shuttle, the Buran, flew in 1988, but without a human crew. Another shuttle, Ptichka, eventually ended up under construction, as the shuttle project was canceled in 1991. For their launch into space, there is today an unused superpower rocket, Energia, which is the most powerful in the world.

In the late 1980s, the Soviet Union managed to build the Mir orbital station. It was built on the construction of Salyut stations and its only role was civilian-grade research tasks.

Mir was the only orbital station in operation from 1986 to 1998. Gradually, other modules were added to it, including American ones. However, the station deteriorated rapidly after a fire on board, so in 2001 it was decided to bring it into the atmosphere where it burned down.

Human rights

Human rights in the Soviet Union were severely limited. The Soviet Union was a totalitarian state from 1927 until 1953 and a one-party state until 1990. Freedom of speech was suppressed and dissent was punished. Independent political activities were not tolerated, whether these involved participation in free labor unions, private corporations, independent churches or opposition political parties. The freedom of movement within and especially outside the country was limited. The state restricted rights of citizens to private property.

The Soviet conception of human rights was very different from international law. According to Soviet legal theory, "it is the government who is the beneficiary of human rights which are to be asserted against the individual". The Soviet state was considered as the source of human rights. Therefore, the Soviet legal system regarded law as an arm of politics and courts as agencies of the government. Extensive extra-judicial powers were given to the Soviet secret police agencies. The Soviet government in practice significantly curbed the rule of law, civil liberties, protection of law and guarantees of property, which were considered as examples of "bourgeois morality" by Soviet law theorists such as Andrey Vyshinsky. According to Vladimir Lenin, the purpose of socialist courts was "not to eliminate terror ... but to substantiate it and legitimize it in principle".

The Soviet Union signed legally-binding human rights documents, such as the International Covenant on Civil and Political Rights in 1973, but they were neither widely known or accessible to people living under Communist rule, nor were they taken seriously by the Communist authorities.

Economy 

The Soviet Union adopted a command economy, whereby production and distribution of goods were centralized and directed by the government. The first Bolshevik experience with a command economy was the policy of War communism, which involved the nationalization of industry, centralized distribution of output, coercive requisition of agricultural production, and attempts to eliminate money circulation, private enterprises and free trade. After the severe economic collapse, Lenin replaced war communism by the New Economic Policy (NEP) in 1921, legalizing free trade and private ownership of small businesses. The economy quickly recovered as a result.

After a long debate among the members of the Politburo about the course of economic development, by 1928–1929, upon gaining control of the country, Stalin abandoned the NEP and pushed for full central planning, starting forced collectivization of agriculture and enacting draconian labor legislation. Resources were mobilized for rapid industrialization, which significantly expanded Soviet capacity in heavy industry and capital goods during the 1930s. The primary motivation for industrialization was preparation for war, mostly due to distrust of the outside capitalist world. As a result, the USSR was transformed from a largely agrarian economy into a great industrial power, leading the way for its emergence as a superpower after World War II. The war caused extensive devastation of the Soviet economy and infrastructure, which required massive reconstruction.

By the early 1940s, the Soviet economy had become relatively self-sufficient; for most of the period until the creation of Comecon, only a tiny share of domestic products was traded internationally. After the creation of the Eastern Bloc, external trade rose rapidly. However, the influence of the world economy on the USSR was limited by fixed domestic prices and a state monopoly on foreign trade. Grain and sophisticated consumer manufactures became major import articles from around the 1960s. During the arms race of the Cold War, the Soviet economy was burdened by military expenditures, heavily lobbied for by a powerful bureaucracy dependent on the arms industry. At the same time, the USSR became the largest arms exporter to the Third World. Significant amounts of Soviet resources during the Cold War were allocated in aid to the other socialist states.

From the 1930s until its dissolution in late 1991, the way the Soviet economy operated remained essentially unchanged. The economy was formally directed by central planning, carried out by Gosplan and organized in five-year plans. However, in practice, the plans were highly aggregated and provisional, subject to ad hoc intervention by superiors. All critical economic decisions were taken by the political leadership. Allocated resources and plan targets were usually denominated in rubles rather than in physical goods. Credit was discouraged, but widespread. The final allocation of output was achieved through relatively decentralized, unplanned contracting. Although in theory prices were legally set from above, in practice they were often negotiated, and informal horizontal links (e.g. between producer factories) were widespread.

A number of basic services were state-funded, such as education and health care. In the manufacturing sector, heavy industry and defence were prioritized over consumer goods. Consumer goods, particularly outside large cities, were often scarce, of poor quality and limited variety. Under the command economy, consumers had almost no influence on production, and the changing demands of a population with growing incomes could not be satisfied by supplies at rigidly fixed prices. A massive unplanned second economy grew up at low levels alongside the planned one, providing some of the goods and services that the planners could not. The legalization of some elements of the decentralized economy was attempted with the reform of 1965.

Although statistics of the Soviet economy are notoriously unreliable and its economic growth difficult to estimate precisely, by most accounts, the economy continued to expand until the mid-1980s. During the 1950s and 1960s, it had comparatively high growth and was catching up to the West. However, after 1970, the growth, while still positive, steadily declined much more quickly and consistently than in other countries, despite a rapid increase in the capital stock (the rate of capital increase was only surpassed by Japan).

Overall, the growth rate of per capita income in the Soviet Union between 1960 and 1989 was slightly above the world average (based on 102 countries). A 1986 study published in the American Journal of Public Health claimed that, citing World Bank data, the Soviet model provided a better quality of life and human development than market economies at the same level of economic development in most cases. According to Stanley Fischer and William Easterly, growth could have been faster. By their calculation, per capita income in 1989 should have been twice higher than it was, considering the amount of investment, education and population. The authors attribute this poor performance to the low productivity of capital. Steven Rosefielde states that the standard of living declined due to Stalin's despotism. While there was a brief improvement after his death, it lapsed into stagnation.

In 1987, Mikhail Gorbachev attempted to reform and revitalize the economy with his program of perestroika. His policies relaxed state control over enterprises but did not replace it by market incentives, resulting in a sharp decline in output. The economy, already suffering from reduced petroleum export revenues, started to collapse. Prices were still fixed, and the property was still largely state-owned until after the country's dissolution. For most of the period after World War II until its collapse, Soviet GDP (PPP) was the second-largest in the world, and third during the second half of the 1980s, although on a per-capita basis, it was behind that of First World countries. Compared to countries with similar per-capita GDP in 1928, the Soviet Union experienced significant growth.

In 1990, the country had a Human Development Index of 0.920, placing it in the ‘high’ category of human development. It was the third-highest in the Eastern Bloc, behind Czechoslovakia and East Germany, and the 25th in the world of 130 countries.

Energy 

The need for fuel declined in the Soviet Union from the 1970s to the 1980s, both per ruble of gross social product and per ruble of industrial product. At the start, this decline grew very rapidly but gradually slowed down between 1970 and 1975. From 1975 and 1980, it grew even slower, only 2.6%. David Wilson, a historian, believed that the gas industry would account for 40% of Soviet fuel production by the end of the century. His theory did not come to fruition because of the USSR's collapse. The USSR, in theory, would have continued to have an economic growth rate of 2–2.5% during the 1990s because of Soviet energy fields. However, the energy sector faced many difficulties, among them the country's high military expenditure and hostile relations with the First World.

Petroleum and petroleum-based products, natural gas, metals, wood, agricultural products, and a variety of manufactured goods, primarily machinery, arms and military equipment, were exported. In the 1970s and 1980s, the USSR heavily relied on fossil fuel exports to earn hard currency. At its peak in 1988, it was the largest producer and second-largest exporter of crude oil, surpassed only by Saudi Arabia.

Science and technology 

The Soviet Union placed great emphasis on science and technology within its economy, however, the most remarkable Soviet successes in technology, such as producing the world's first space satellite, typically were the responsibility of the military. Lenin believed that the USSR would never overtake the developed world if it remained as technologically backward as it was upon its founding. Soviet authorities proved their commitment to Lenin's belief by developing massive networks, research and development organizations. In the early 1960s, the Soviets awarded 40% of chemistry PhDs to women, compared to only 5% in the United States. By 1989, Soviet scientists were among the world's best-trained specialists in several areas, such as Energy physics, selected areas of medicine, mathematics, welding and military technologies. Due to rigid state planning and bureaucracy, the Soviets remained far behind technologically in chemistry, biology, and computers when compared to the First World. The Soviet Union also had more scientists and engineers, relative to the world population, than any other major country due to the strong levels of state support for scientific developments by the 1980s. The Soviet government opposed and persecuted geneticists in favour of Lysenkoism, a pseudoscience rejected by the scientific community in the Soviet Union and abroad but supported by Stalin's inner circles. Implemented in the USSR and China, it resulted in reduced crop yields and is widely believed to have contributed to the Great Chinese Famine.

Under the Reagan administration, Project Socrates determined that the Soviet Union addressed the acquisition of science and technology in a manner that was radically different from what the US was using. In the case of the US, economic prioritization was being used for indigenous research and development as the means to acquire science and technology in both the private and public sectors. In contrast, the USSR was offensively and defensively maneuvering in the acquisition and use of the worldwide technology, to increase the competitive advantage that they acquired from the technology while preventing the US from acquiring a competitive advantage. However, technology-based planning was executed in a centralized, government-centric manner that greatly hindered its flexibility. This was exploited by the US to undermine the strength of the Soviet Union and thus foster its reform.

Transport 

Transport was a vital component of the country's economy. The economic centralization of the late 1920s and 1930s led to the development of infrastructure on a massive scale, most notably the establishment of Aeroflot, an aviation enterprise. The country had a wide variety of modes of transport by land, water and air. However, due to inadequate maintenance, much of the road, water and Soviet civil aviation transport were outdated and technologically backward compared to the First World.

Soviet rail transport was the largest and most intensively used in the world; it was also better developed than most of its Western counterparts. By the late 1970s and early 1980s, Soviet economists were calling for the construction of more roads to alleviate some of the burdens from the railways and to improve the Soviet government budget. The street network and automotive industry remained underdeveloped, and dirt roads were common outside major cities. Soviet maintenance projects proved unable to take care of even the few roads the country had. By the early-to-mid-1980s, the Soviet authorities tried to solve the road problem by ordering the construction of new ones. Meanwhile, the automobile industry was growing at a faster rate than road construction. The underdeveloped road network led to a growing demand for public transport.

Despite improvements, several aspects of the transport sector were still riddled with problems due to outdated infrastructure, lack of investment, corruption and bad decision-making. Soviet authorities were unable to meet the growing demand for transport infrastructure and services.

The Soviet merchant navy was one of the largest in the world.

Demographics 

Excess deaths throughout World War I and the Russian Civil War (including the postwar famine) amounted to a combined total of 18 million, some 10 million in the 1930s, and more than 26 million in 1941–1945. The postwar Soviet population was 45 to 50 million smaller than it would have been if pre-war demographic growth had continued. According to Catherine Merridale, ‘...reasonable estimate would place the total number of excess deaths for the whole period somewhere around 60 million.’

The birth rate of the USSR decreased from 44.0 per thousand in 1926 to 18.0 in 1974, mainly due to increasing urbanization and the rising average age of marriages. The mortality rate demonstrated a gradual decrease as well – from 23.7 per thousand in 1926 to 8.7 in 1974. In general, the birth rates of the southern republics in Transcaucasia and Central Asia were considerably higher than those in the northern parts of the Soviet Union, and in some cases even increased in the post–World War II period, a phenomenon partly attributed to slower rates of urbanization and traditionally earlier marriages in the southern republics. Soviet Europe moved towards sub-replacement fertility, while Soviet Central Asia continued to exhibit population growth well above replacement-level fertility.

The late 1960s and the 1970s witnessed a reversal of the declining trajectory of the rate of mortality in the USSR, and was especially notable among men of working age, but was also prevalent in Russia and other predominantly Slavic areas of the country. An analysis of the official data from the late 1980s showed that after worsening in the late-1970s and the early 1980s, adult mortality began to improve again. The infant mortality rate increased from 24.7 in 1970 to 27.9 in 1974. Some researchers regarded the rise as mostly real, a consequence of worsening health conditions and services. The rises in both adult and infant mortality were not explained or defended by Soviet officials, and the Soviet government stopped publishing all mortality statistics for ten years. Soviet demographers and health specialists remained silent about the mortality increases until the late-1980s, when the publication of mortality data resumed, and researchers could delve into the real causes.

Women and fertility 

Under Lenin, the state made explicit commitments to promote the equality of men and women. Many early Russian feminists and ordinary Russian working women actively participated in the Revolution, and many more were affected by the events of that period and the new policies. Beginning in October 1918, Lenin's government liberalized divorce and abortion laws, decriminalized homosexuality (re-criminalized in the 1930s), permitted cohabitation, and ushered in a host of reforms. However, without birth control, the new system produced many broken marriages, as well as countless out-of-wedlock children. The epidemic of divorces and extramarital affairs created social hardships when Soviet leaders wanted people to concentrate their efforts on growing the economy. Giving women control over their fertility also led to a precipitous decline in the birth rate, perceived as a threat to their country's military power. By 1936, Stalin reversed most of the liberal laws, ushering in a pronatalist era that lasted for decades.

By 1917, Russia became the first great power to grant women the right to vote. After heavy casualties in World War I and II, women outnumbered men in Russia by a 4:3 ratio. This contributed to the larger role women played in Russian society compared to other great powers at the time.

Education 

Anatoly Lunacharsky became the first People's Commissar for Education of Soviet Russia. In the beginning, the Soviet authorities placed great emphasis on the elimination of illiteracy. All left-handed children were forced to write with their right hand in the Soviet school system. Literate people were automatically hired as teachers. For a short period, quality was sacrificed for quantity. By 1940, Stalin could announce that illiteracy had been eliminated. Throughout the 1930s, social mobility rose sharply, which has been attributed to reforms in education. In the aftermath of World War II, the country's educational system expanded dramatically, which had a tremendous effect. In the 1960s, nearly all children had access to education, the only exception being those living in remote areas. Nikita Khrushchev tried to make education more accessible, making it clear to children that education was closely linked to the needs of society. Education also became important in giving rise to the New Man. Citizens directly entering the workforce had the constitutional right to a job and to free vocational training.

The education system was highly centralized and universally accessible to all citizens, with affirmative action for applicants from nations associated with cultural backwardness. However, as part of a general antisemitic policy, an unofficial Jewish quota was applied in the leading institutions of higher education by subjecting Jewish applicants to harsher entrance examinations. The Brezhnev era also introduced a rule that required all university applicants to present a reference from the local Komsomol party secretary. According to statistics from 1986, the number of higher education students per the population of 10,000 was 181 for the USSR, compared to 517 for the US.

Nationalities and ethnic groups 

The Soviet Union was an ethnically diverse country, with more than 100 distinct ethnic groups. The total population of the country was estimated at 293 million in 1991. According to a 1990 estimate, the majority of the population were Russians (50.78%), followed by Ukrainians (15.45%) and Uzbeks (5.84%). Overall, in 1989 the ethnic demography of the country showed that 69.8% was East Slavic, 17.5% was Turkic, 1.6% were Armenians, 1.6% were Balts, 1.5% were Finnic, 1.5% were Tajik, 1.4% were Georgian, 1.2% were Moldovan and 4.1% were of other various ethnic groups.

All citizens of the USSR had their own ethnic affiliation. The ethnicity of a person was chosen at the age of sixteen by the child's parents. If the parents did not agree, the child was automatically assigned the ethnicity of the father. Partly due to Soviet policies, some of the smaller minority ethnic groups were considered part of larger ones, such as the Mingrelians of Georgia, who were classified with the linguistically related Georgians. Some ethnic groups voluntarily assimilated, while others were brought in by force. Russians, Belarusians, and Ukrainians, who were all East Slavic and Orthodox, shared close cultural, ethnic, and religious ties, while other groups did not. With multiple nationalities living in the same territory, ethnic antagonisms developed over the years.

Members of various ethnicities participated in legislative bodies. Organs of power like the Politburo, the Secretariat of the Central Committee etc., were formally ethnically neutral, but in reality, ethnic Russians were overrepresented, although there were also non-Russian leaders in the Soviet leadership, such as Joseph Stalin, Grigory Zinoviev, Nikolai Podgorny or Andrei Gromyko. During the Soviet era, a significant number of ethnic Russians and Ukrainians migrated to other Soviet republics, and many of them settled there. According to the last census in 1989, the Russian ‘diaspora’ in the Soviet republics had reached 25 million.

Health 

In 1917, before the revolution, health conditions were significantly behind those of developed countries. As Lenin later noted, ‘Either the lice will defeat socialism, or socialism will defeat the lice’. The Soviet principle of health care was conceived by the People's Commissariat for Health in 1918. Health care was to be controlled by the state and would be provided to its citizens free of charge, a revolutionary concept at the time. Article 42 of the 1977 Soviet Constitution gave all citizens the right to health protection and free access to any health institutions in the USSR. Before Leonid Brezhnev became general secretary, the Soviet healthcare system was held in high esteem by many foreign specialists. This changed, however, from Brezhnev's accession and Mikhail Gorbachev's tenure as leader, during which the health care system was heavily criticized for many basic faults, such as the quality of service and the unevenness in its provision. Minister of Health Yevgeniy Chazov, during the 19th Congress of the Communist Party of the Soviet Union, while highlighting such successes as having the most doctors and hospitals in the world, recognized the system's areas for improvement and felt that billions of rubles were squandered. 

After the revolution, life expectancy for all age groups went up. This statistic in itself was seen by some that the socialist system was superior to the capitalist system. These improvements continued into the 1960s when statistics indicated that the life expectancy briefly surpassed that of the United States. Life expectancy started to decline in the 1970s, possibly because of alcohol abuse. At the same time, infant mortality began to rise. After 1974, the government stopped publishing statistics on the matter. This trend can be partly explained by the number of pregnancies rising drastically in the Asian part of the country where infant mortality was the highest while declining markedly in the more developed European part of the Soviet Union.

Dentistry 
Soviet dental technology and dental health were considered notoriously bad. In 1991, the average 35-year-old had 12 to 14 cavities, fillings or missing teeth. Toothpaste was often not available, and toothbrushes did not conform to standards of modern dentistry.

Language 

Under Lenin, the government gave small language groups their own writing systems. The development of these writing systems was highly successful, even though some flaws were detected. During the later days of the USSR, countries with the same multilingual situation implemented similar policies. A serious problem when creating these writing systems was that the languages differed dialectally greatly from each other. When a language had been given a writing system and appeared in a notable publication, it would attain ‘official language’ status. There were many minority languages which never received their own writing system; therefore, their speakers were forced to have a second language. There are examples where the government retreated from this policy, most notably under Stalin where education was discontinued in languages that were not widespread. These languages were then assimilated into another language, mostly Russian. During World War II, some minority languages were banned, and their speakers accused of collaborating with the enemy.

As the most widely spoken of the Soviet Union's many languages, Russian de facto functioned as an official language, as the ‘language of interethnic communication’, but only assumed the de jure status as the official national language in 1990.

Religion 

Christianity and Islam had the highest number of adherents among the religious citizens. Eastern Christianity predominated among Christians, with Russia's traditional Russian Orthodox Church being the largest Christian denomination. About 90% of the Soviet Union's Muslims were Sunnis, with Shias being concentrated in the Azerbaijan SSR. Smaller groups included Roman Catholics, Jews, Buddhists, and a variety of Protestant denominations (especially Baptists and Lutherans).

Religious influence had been strong in the Russian Empire. The Russian Orthodox Church enjoyed a privileged status as the church of the monarchy and took part in carrying out official state functions. The immediate period following the establishment of the Soviet state included a struggle against the Orthodox Church, which the revolutionaries considered an ally of the former ruling classes.

In Soviet law, the ‘freedom to hold religious services’ was constitutionally guaranteed, although the ruling Communist Party regarded religion as incompatible with the Marxist spirit of scientific materialism. In practice, the Soviet system subscribed to a narrow interpretation of this right, and in fact used a range of official measures to discourage religion and curb the activities of religious groups.

The 1918 Council of People's Commissars decree establishing the Russian SFSR as a secular state also decreed that ‘the teaching of religion in all [places] where subjects of general instruction are taught, is forbidden. Citizens may teach and may be taught religion privately.’ Among further restrictions, those adopted in 1929 included express prohibitions on a range of church activities, including meetings for organized Bible study. Both Christian and non-Christian establishments were shut down by the thousands in the 1920s and 1930s. By 1940, as many as 90% of the churches, synagogues, and mosques that had been operating in 1917 were closed; the majority of them were demolished or re-purposed for state needs with little concern for their historic and cultural value. 

More than 85,000 Orthodox priests were shot in 1937 alone. Only a twelfth of the Russian Orthodox Church's priests were left functioning in their parishes by 1941. In the period between 1927 and 1940, the number of Orthodox Churches in Russia fell from 29,584 to less than 500 (1.7%).

The Soviet Union was officially a secular state, but a ‘government-sponsored program of forced conversion to atheism’ was conducted under the doctrine of state atheism. The government targeted religions based on state interests, and while most organized religions were never outlawed, religious property was confiscated, believers were harassed, and religion was ridiculed while atheism was propagated in schools. In 1925, the government founded the League of Militant Atheists to intensify the propaganda campaign. Accordingly, although personal expressions of religious faith were not explicitly banned, a strong sense of social stigma was imposed on them by the formal structures and mass media, and it was generally considered unacceptable for members of certain professions (teachers, state bureaucrats, soldiers) to be openly religious. While persecution accelerated following Stalin's rise to power, a revival of Orthodoxy was fostered by the government during World War II and the Soviet authorities sought to control the Russian Orthodox Church rather than liquidate it. During the first five years of Soviet power, the Bolsheviks executed 28 Russian Orthodox bishops and over 1,200 Russian Orthodox priests. Many others were imprisoned or exiled. Believers were harassed and persecuted. Most seminaries were closed, and the publication of most religious material was prohibited. By 1941, only 500 churches remained open out of about 54,000 in existence before World War I.

Convinced that religious anti-Sovietism had become a thing of the past, and with the looming threat of war, the Stalin regime began shifting to a more moderate religion policy in the late 1930s. Soviet religious establishments overwhelmingly rallied to support the war effort during World War II. Amid other accommodations to religious faith after the German invasion, churches were reopened. Radio Moscow began broadcasting a religious hour, and a historic meeting between Stalin and Orthodox Church leader Patriarch Sergius of Moscow was held in 1943. Stalin had the support of the majority of the religious people in the USSR even through the late 1980s. The general tendency of this period was an increase in religious activity among believers of all faiths.

Under Nikita Khrushchev, the state leadership clashed with the churches in 1958–1964, a period when atheism was emphasized in the educational curriculum, and numerous state publications promoted atheistic views. During this period, the number of churches fell from 20,000 to 10,000 from 1959 to 1965, and the number of synagogues dropped from 500 to 97. The number of working mosques also declined, falling from 1,500 to 500 within a decade.

Religious institutions remained monitored by the Soviet government, but churches, synagogues, temples, and mosques were all given more leeway in the Brezhnev era. Official relations between the Orthodox Church and the government again warmed to the point that the Brezhnev government twice honored Orthodox Patriarch Alexy I with the Order of the Red Banner of Labour. A poll conducted by Soviet authorities in 1982 recorded 20% of the Soviet population as ‘active religious believers.’

Legacy 

The legacy of the USSR remains a controversial topic. The socio-economic nature of communist states such as the USSR, especially under Stalin, has also been much debated, varyingly being labelled a form of bureaucratic collectivism, state capitalism, state socialism, or a totally unique mode of production.
The USSR implemented a broad range of policies over a long period of time, with a large amount of conflicting policies being implemented by different leaders. Some have a positive view of it whilst others are critical towards the country, calling it a repressive oligarchy. The opinions on the USSR are complex and have changed over time, with different generations having different views on the matter as well as on Soviet policies corresponding to separate time periods during its history. Leftists have largely varying views on the USSR. Whilst some leftists such as anarchists and other libertarian socialists, agree it did not give the workers control over the means of production and was a centralized oligarchy, others have more positive opinions as to the Bolshevik policies and Vladimir Lenin. Many anti-Stalinist leftists such as anarchists are extremely critical of Soviet authoritarianism and repression. Much of the criticism it receives is centered around massacres in the Soviet Union, the centralized hierarchy present in the USSR and mass political repression as well as violence towards government critics and political dissidents such as other leftists. Critics also point towards its failure to implement any substantial worker cooperatives or implementing worker liberation as well as corruption and the Soviet authoritarian nature.

In a 2021 poll, 70% of Russians indicated they had a favourable view of Joseph Stalin. In Armenia, 12% of respondents said the USSR collapse did good, while 66% said it did harm. In Kyrgyzstan, 16% of respondents said the collapse of the USSR did good, while 61% said it did harm. In a 2018 Rating Sociological Group poll, 47% of Ukrainian respondents had a positive opinion of Soviet leader Leonid Brezhnev, who ruled the Soviet Union from 1964 to 1982. A 2021 poll conducted by the Levada Center found that 49% of Russians prefer the USSR's political system, while 18% prefer the current political system and 16% would prefer a Western Democracy. A further 62% of people polled preferred the Soviet system of central planning, while 24% prefer a market-based system. Much of the admiration of the USSR comes from the failings of the modern post-Soviet governments such as the control by oligarchs, corruption and outdated Soviet-era infrastructure as well as the rise and dominance of organized crime after the dissolution of the Soviet Union all directly leading into nostalgia for it.

The 1941–1945 period of World War II is still known in Russia as the ‘Great Patriotic War’. The war became a topic of great importance in cinema, literature, history lessons at school, the mass media, and the arts. As a result of the massive losses suffered by the military and civilians during the conflict, Victory Day celebrated on 9 May is still one of the most important and emotional dates in Russia.

In the former Soviet Republics 

In some post Soviet republics, there is a more negative view of the USSR, although there is no unanimity on the matter. In large part due to the Holodomor, ethnic Ukrainians have a negative view of it. Russian-speaking Ukrainians of Ukraine's southern and eastern regions have a more positive view of the USSR. In some countries with internal conflict, there is also nostalgia for the USSR, especially for refugees of the post-Soviet conflicts who have been forced to flee their homes and have been displaced. This nostalgia is less an admiration for the country or its policies than it is a longing to return to their homes and not to live in poverty. The many Russian enclaves in the former USSR republics such as Transnistria have in a general a positive remembrance of it.

By the political left 

The left's view of the USSR is complex. While some leftists regard the USSR as an example of state capitalism or that it was an oligarchical state, other leftists admire Vladimir Lenin and the Russian Revolution. Council communists generally view the USSR as failing to create class consciousness, turning into a corrupt state in which the elite controlled society.

Anarchists are also critical of the country, labeling the Soviet system as red fascism. Factors contributing to the anarchist animosity towards the USSR included the Soviet attacks against the Makhnovist movement after an initial alliance, the suppression of the anarchist Kronstadt rebellion, and the defeat of the rival anarchist factions by the Soviet-supported Communist faction during the Spanish Civil War.

Maoists also have a mixed opinion on the USSR, viewing it negatively during the Sino-Soviet Split and denouncing it as revisionist and reverted to capitalism. The Chinese government in 1963 articulated its criticism of the USSR's system and promoted China's ideological line as an alternative.

Culture 

The culture of the Soviet Union passed through several stages during the USSR's existence. During the first decade following the revolution, there was relative freedom and artists experimented with several different styles to find a distinctive Soviet style of art. Lenin wanted art to be accessible to the Russian people. On the other hand, hundreds of intellectuals, writers, and artists were exiled or executed, and their work banned, such as Nikolay Gumilyov who was shot for alleged conspiring against the Bolshevik regime, and Yevgeny Zamyatin.

The government encouraged a variety of trends. In art and literature, numerous schools, some traditional and others radically experimental, proliferated. Communist writers Maxim Gorky and Vladimir Mayakovsky were active during this time. As a means of influencing a largely illiterate society, films received encouragement from the state, and much of director Sergei Eisenstein's best work dates from this period.

During Stalin's rule, the Soviet culture was characterized by the rise and domination of the government-imposed style of socialist realism, with all other trends being severely repressed, with rare exceptions, such as Mikhail Bulgakov's works. Many writers were imprisoned and killed.

Following the Khrushchev Thaw, censorship was diminished. During this time, a distinctive period of Soviet culture developed, characterized by conformist public life and an intense focus on personal life. Greater experimentation in art forms was again permissible, resulting in the production of more sophisticated and subtly critical work. The regime loosened its emphasis on socialist realism; thus, for instance, many protagonists of the novels of author Yury Trifonov concerned themselves with problems of daily life rather than with building socialism. Underground dissident literature, known as samizdat, developed during this late period. In architecture, the Khrushchev era mostly focused on functional design as opposed to the highly decorated style of Stalin's epoch. In music, in response to the increasing popularity of forms of popular music like jazz in the West, many jazz orchestras were permitted throughout the USSR, notably the Melodiya Ensemble, named after the principle record label in the USSR.

In the second half of the 1980s, Gorbachev's policies of perestroika and glasnost significantly expanded freedom of expression throughout the country in the media and the press.

Sport 

In summer of 1923 in Moscow was established the Proletarian Sports Society "Dynamo" as a sports organization of Cheka.

Founded on 20 July 1924 in Moscow, Sovetsky Sport was the first sports newspaper of the Soviet Union.

On 13 July 1925 the Central Committee of the Russian Communist Party (Bolsheviks) adopted a statement "About the party's tasks in sphere of physical culture". In the statement was determined the role of physical culture in Soviet society and the party's tasks in political leadership of physical culture movement in the country.

The Soviet Olympic Committee formed on 21 April 1951, and the IOC recognized the new body in its 45th session. In the same year, when the Soviet representative Konstantin Andrianov became an IOC member, the USSR officially joined the Olympic Movement. The 1952 Summer Olympics in Helsinki thus became first Olympic Games for Soviet athletes. The Soviet Union was the biggest rival to the United States at the Summer Olympics, winning six of its nine appearances at the games and also topping the medal tally at the Winter Olympics six times. The Soviet Union's Olympics success has been attributed to its large investment in sports to demonstrate its superpower image and political influence on a global stage.

The Soviet Union national ice hockey team won nearly every world championship and Olympic tournament between 1954 and 1991 and never failed to medal in any International Ice Hockey Federation (IIHF) tournament in which they competed.

The advent of the state-sponsored ‘full-time amateur athlete’ of the Eastern Bloc countries further eroded the ideology of the pure amateur, as it put the self-financed amateurs of the Western countries at a disadvantage. The Soviet Union entered teams of athletes who were all nominally students, soldiers, or working in a profession – in reality, the state paid many of these competitors to train on a full-time basis. Nevertheless, the IOC held to the traditional rules regarding amateurism.

A 1989 report by a committee of the Australian Senate claimed that ‘there is hardly a medal winner at the Moscow Games, certainly not a gold medal winner... who is not on one sort of drug or another: usually several kinds. The Moscow Games might well have been called the Chemists' Games’.

A member of the IOC Medical Commission, Manfred Donike, privately ran additional tests with a new technique for identifying abnormal levels of testosterone by measuring its ratio to epitestosterone in urine. Twenty percent of the specimens he tested, including those from sixteen gold medalists, would have resulted in disciplinary proceedings had the tests been official. The results of Donike's unofficial tests later convinced the IOC to add his new technique to their testing protocols. The first documented case of ‘blood doping’ occurred at the 1980 Summer Olympics when a runner was transfused with two pints of blood before winning medals in the 5000 m and 10,000 m.

Documentation obtained in 2016 revealed the Soviet Union's plans for a statewide doping system in track and field in preparation for the 1984 Summer Olympics in Los Angeles. Dated before the decision to boycott the 1984 Games, the document detailed the existing steroids operations of the program, along with suggestions for further enhancements. Dr. Sergei Portugalov of the Institute for Physical Culture prepared the communication, directed to the Soviet Union's head of track and field. Portugalov later became one of the leading figures involved in the implementation of Russian doping before the 2016 Summer Olympics.

See also 

Baltic states under Soviet rule (1944–1991)
Cold War
Warsaw Pact
North Atlantic Treaty Organization
Communism
Eastern Bloc
Nostalgia for the Soviet Union
Ideocracy
Index of Soviet Union–related articles
Religion in the Soviet Union
Korenizatsiya
Neo-Sovietism
Soviet patriotism
Russian Empire
Orphans in the Soviet Union
Post-Soviet states
Soviet Empire
Second Cold War

Notes

References

Bibliography 

 
 
 
 
 
 
 
 
 
 
 Ostrovsky, Alexander (2010). Кто поставил Горбачёва? (Who put Gorbachev?)  — М.: Алгоритм-Эксмо, 2010. — 544 с. ISBN 978-5-699-40627-2
 Ostrovsky, Alexander (2011). Глупость или измена? Расследование гибели СССР. (Stupidity or treason? Investigation of the death of the USSR)  М.: Форум, Крымский мост-9Д, 2011. — 864 с. ISBN 978-5-89747-068-6

Further reading

Surveys 
 A Country Study: Soviet Union (Former) . Library of Congress Country Studies, 1991.
 Brown, Archie, et al., eds.: The Cambridge Encyclopedia of Russia and the Soviet Union (Cambridge University Press, 1982).
   historiographical essay that covers the scholarship of the three major schools, totalitarianism, revisionism, and post-revisionism.
 Gilbert, Martin. Routledge Atlas of Russian History (4th ed. 2007) excerpt and text search.
 Gorodetsky, Gabriel, ed. Soviet Foreign Policy, 1917–1991: A Retrospective (2014).
 Grant, Ted. Russia, from Revolution to Counter-Revolution, London, Well Red Publications, 1997.
 Hosking, Geoffrey. The First Socialist Society: A History of the Soviet Union from Within (2nd ed. Harvard UP 1992) 570 pp.
 Howe, G. Melvyn: The Soviet Union: A Geographical Survey 2nd. edn. (Estover, UK: MacDonald and Evans, 1983).
 Kort, Michael. The Soviet Colossus: History and Aftermath (7th ed. 2010) 502 pp.
 McCauley, Martin. The Rise and Fall of the Soviet Union  (2007), 522 pages.
 Moss, Walter G. A History of Russia. Vol. 2: Since 1855. 2d ed. Anthem Press, 2005.
 Nove, Alec. An Economic History of the USSR, 1917–1991. (3rd ed. 1993) online free to borrow.
 Pipes, Richard. Communism: A History (2003).
 Pons, Silvio, and Stephen A. Smith, eds.  The Cambridge History of Communism (Volume 1): World Revolution and Socialism in One Country, 1917–1941 (2017) excerpt 
Naimark, Norman Silvio Pons and Sophie Quinn-Judge, eds. The Cambridge History of Communism (Volume 2): The Socialist Camp and World Power, 1941-1960s (2017) excerpt 
 Fürst, Juliane, Silvio Pons and Mark Selden, eds. The Cambridge History of Communism (Volume 3): Endgames?.Late Communism in Global Perspective, 1968 to the Present  (2017)  excerpt 
 Service, Robert. A History of Twentieth-Century Russia (2nd ed. 1999).

Lenin and Leninism 
 Clark, Ronald W. Lenin (1988). 570 pp.
 Debo, Richard K. Survival and Consolidation: The Foreign Policy of Soviet Russia, 1918–1921 (1992).
 Marples, David R. Lenin's Revolution: Russia, 1917–1921 (2000) 156pp. short survey.
 Pipes, Richard. A Concise History of the Russian Revolution (1996) excerpt and text search, by a leading conservative.
 Pipes, Richard. Russia under the Bolshevik Regime. (1994). 608 pp.
 Service, Robert. Lenin: A Biography (2002), 561pp; standard scholarly biography; a short version of his 3 vol detailed biography.
 Volkogonov, Dmitri. Lenin: Life and Legacy (1994). 600 pp.

Stalin and Stalinism 
 Daniels, R. V., ed. The Stalin Revolution (1965).
 Davies, Sarah, and James Harris, eds. Stalin: A New History, (2006), 310pp, 14 specialized essays by scholars excerpt and text search.
 De Jonge, Alex. Stalin and the Shaping of the Soviet Union (1986).
 Fitzpatrick, Sheila, ed. Stalinism: New Directions, (1999), 396pp excerpts from many scholars on the impact of Stalinism on the people (little on Stalin himself) online edition.
 Fitzpatrick, Sheila. "Impact of the Opening of Soviet Archives on Western Scholarship on Soviet Social History." Russian Review 74#3 (2015): 377–400; historiography.
 Hoffmann, David L. ed. Stalinism: The Essential Readings, (2002) essays by 12 scholars.
 Laqueur, Walter. Stalin: The Glasnost Revelations (1990).
 Kershaw, Ian, and Moshe Lewin. Stalinism and Nazism: Dictatorships in Comparison (2004) excerpt and text search.
  976 pp.; First volume of a trilogy.
 ; 1184 pp.; Second volume of a trilogy.
 Lee, Stephen J. Stalin and the Soviet Union (1999) online edition.
 Lewis, Jonathan. Stalin: A Time for Judgement (1990).
 McNeal, Robert H. Stalin: Man and Ruler (1988).
 Martens, Ludo. Another view of Stalin (1994), a highly favorable view from a Maoist historian.
 Service, Robert. Stalin: A Biography (2004), along with Tucker the standard biography.
 Trotsky, Leon. Stalin: An Appraisal of the Man and His Influence, (1967), an interpretation by Stalin's worst enemy.
 Tucker, Robert C. Stalin as Revolutionary, 1879–1929 (1973); Stalin in Power: The Revolution from Above, 1929–1941 (1990) online edition with Service, a standard biography; at ACLS e-books.

World War II 
 Barber, John, and Mark Harrison. The Soviet Home Front: A Social and Economic History of the USSR in World War II, Longman, 1991.
 Bellamy, Chris. Absolute War: Soviet Russia in the Second World War (2008), 880pp excerpt and text search.
 Berkhoff, Karel C. Harvest of Despair: Life and Death in Ukraine Under Nazi Rule. Harvard U. Press, 2004. 448 pp.
 Berkhoff, Karel C. Motherland in Danger: Soviet Propaganda during World War II (2012) excerpt and text search covers both propaganda and reality of homefront conditions.
 Braithwaite, Rodric. Moscow 1941: A City and Its People at War (2006).
 Broekmeyer, Marius. Stalin, the Russians, and Their War, 1941–1945. 2004. 315 pp.
 Dallin, Alexander. Odessa, 1941–1944: A Case Study of Soviet Territory under Foreign Rule. Portland: Int. Specialized Book Service, 1998. 296 pp.
 Kucherenko, Olga. Little Soldiers: How Soviet Children Went to War, 1941–1945 (2011) excerpt and text search.
 Overy, Richard. The road to war (4th ed. 1999), covers 1930s; pp 245–300.
 Overy, Richard. Russia's War: A History of the Soviet Effort: 1941–1945 (1998) excerpt and text search.
 Roberts, Geoffrey. Stalin's Wars: From World War to Cold War, 1939–1953 (2006).
 Schofield, Carey, ed. Russian at War, 1941–1945. (Vendome Press, 1987). 256 pp., a photo-history, with connecting texts. .
 Seaton, Albert. Stalin as Military Commander, (1998) online edition.
 Thurston, Robert W., and Bernd Bonwetsch, eds. The People's War: Responses to World War II in the Soviet Union (2000).
 Uldricks, Teddy J. "War, Politics and Memory: Russian Historians Reevaluate the Origins of World War II," History and Memory 21#2 (2009), pp. 60–82 online, historiography.
  Reports life expectancy at birth fell to a level as low as ten years for females and seven for males in 1933 and plateaued around 25 for females and 15 for males in the period 1941–1944.

Cold War 
 Brzezinski, Zbigniew. The Grand Failure: The Birth and Death of Communism in the Twentieth Century (1989).
 Edmonds, Robin. Soviet Foreign Policy: The Brezhnev Years (1983).
 Goncharov, Sergei, John Lewis and Litai Xue, Uncertain Partners: Stalin, Mao and the Korean War (1993) excerpt and text search.
 Gorlizki, Yoram, and Oleg Khlevniuk. Cold Peace: Stalin and the Soviet Ruling Circle, 1945–1953 (2004) online edition.
 Holloway, David. Stalin and the Bomb: The Soviet Union and Atomic Energy, 1939–1956 (1996) excerpt and text search.
 Mastny, Vojtech. Russia's Road to the Cold War: Diplomacy, Warfare, and the Politics of Communism, 1941–1945 (1979).
 Mastny, Vojtech. The Cold War and Soviet Insecurity: The Stalin Years (1998) excerpt and text search; online complete edition.
 Matlock, Jack. Reagan and Gorbachev: How the Cold War Ended (2005).
 Nation, R. Craig. Black Earth, Red Star: A History of Soviet Security Policy, 1917–1991 (1992).
 Sivachev, Nikolai and Nikolai Yakolev, Russia and the United States (1979), by Soviet historians.
 Taubman, William. Khrushchev: The Man and His Era (2004), Pulitzer Prize; excerpt and text search.
 Taubman, William. Stalin's American Policy: From Entente to Detente to Cold War (1983).
 Taubman, William. Gorbachev: His Life and Times (2017).
 Tint, Herbert. French Foreign Policy since the Second World War (1972) online free to borrow 1945–1971.
 Ulam, Adam B. Expansion and Coexistence: Soviet Foreign Policy, 1917–1973, 2nd ed. (1974).
 Wilson, James Graham. The Triumph of Improvisation: Gorbachev's Adaptability, Reagan's Engagement, and the End of the Cold War (2014).
 Zubok, Vladislav M. Inside the Kremlin's Cold War (1996) 20% excerpt and online search.
 Zubok, Vladislav M. A Failed Empire: The Soviet Union in the Cold War from Stalin to Gorbachev (2007).

Collapse 
 Beschloss, Michael, and Strobe Talbott. At the Highest Levels:The Inside Story of the End of the Cold War (1993).
 Bialer, Seweryn and Michael Mandelbaum, eds. Gorbachev's Russia and American Foreign Policy (1988).
 Carrère d'Encausse, Hélène. Decline of an Empire: the Soviet Socialist Republics in Revolt. First English language ed. New York: Newsweek Books (1979). 304 p. N.B.: Trans. of the author's L'Empire éclaté. .
 Garthoff, Raymond. The Great Transition: American–Soviet Relations and the End of the Cold War (1994), detailed narrative.
 Grachev, A. S. Gorbachev's Gamble: Soviet Foreign Policy and the End of the Cold War (2008) excerpt and text search.
 Hogan, Michael ed. The End of the Cold War. Its Meaning and Implications (1992) articles from Diplomatic History.
 Roger Keeran and Thomas Keeny. Socialism Betrayed: Behind the Collapse of the Soviet Union, International Publishers Co Inc., US 2004.
 Kotkin, Stephen. Armageddon Averted: The Soviet Collapse, 1970–2000 (2008) excerpt and text search.
 Matlock, Jack. Autopsy on an Empire: The American Ambassador's Account of the Collapse of the Soviet Union (1995).
 Ostrovsky Alexander. Кто поставил Горбачёва?  (2010). ("Who brought Gorbachev to power?") – М.: "Алгоритм-Эксмо".  ("Проект "Распад СССР: Тайные пружины власти" – М. "Алгоритм", 2016. Переиздание книги "Кто поставил Горбачёва?") ("Project" Collapse of the USSR: Secret Springs of Power ". Reissue of the book «Who brought Gorbachev to power?» — М.: «Алгоритм», 2016).
 Ostrovsky Alexander. Глупость или измена? Расследование гибели СССР. (2011). ("Foolishness or treason? Investigation into the death of the USSR") М.: "Крымский мост". .
 Pons, S., Romero, F., Reinterpreting the End of the Cold War: Issues, Interpretations, Periodizations, (2005) .
 Remnick, David. Lenin's Tomb: The Last Days of the Soviet Empire, (1994), .
 Solzhenitsyn, Aleksandr. Rebuilding Russia: Reflections and Tentative Proposals, trans. and annotated by Alexis Klimoff. First ed. New York: Farrar, Straus and Giroux, 1991. N.B.: Also discusses the other national constituents of the USSR. .

Social and economic history 
 Bailes, Kendall E. Technology and society under Lenin and Stalin: origins of the Soviet technical intelligentsia, 1917–1941 (1978).
 Bailes, Kendall E. "The American Connection: Ideology and the Transfer of American Technology to the Soviet Union, 1917–1941." Comparative Studies in Society and History 23.3 (1981): 421–448.
 Brooks, Jeffrey. "Public and private values in the Soviet press, 1921–1928." Slavic Review 48.1 (1989): 16–35.
 Caroli, Dorena. "'And all our classes turned into a flower garden again'–science education in Soviet schools in the 1920s and 1930s: the case of biology from Darwinism to Lysenkoism." History of Education 48.1 (2019): 77–98.
 Dobson, Miriam. "The Social History of Post-War Soviet Life" Historical Journal 55.2 (2012): 563–569. Online 
 Dowlah, Alex F., et al. The life and times of soviet socialism (Greenwood, 1997), Emphasis on economic policies. Online.
 Engel, Barbara, et al. A Revolution of Their Own: Voices of Women in Soviet History (1998), Primary sources; Online.
 Fitzpatrick, Sheila. Everyday Stalinism: ordinary life in extraordinary times: Soviet Russia in the 1930s (Oxford UP, 2000). Online.
 Graham, Loren R. Science in Russia and the Soviet Union: A short history (Cambridge UP, 1993).
 Hanson, Philip. The Rise and Fall of the Soviet Economy: An Economic History of the USSR 1945–1991 (2014).
 Heinzen, James W. Inventing a Soviet Countryside: State Power and the Transformation of Rural Russia, 1917–1929 (2004).
 Lapidus, Gail Warshofsky. Women, Work, and Family in the Soviet Union (1982) Online.
 Link, Stefan J. Forging Global Fordism: Nazi Germany, Soviet Russia, and the Contest over the Industrial Order (2020) excerpt 
 Lutz, Wolfgang et al. Demographic Trends and Patterns in the Soviet Union before 1991 (1994) online.
 Mironov, Boris N. "The Development of Literacy in Russia and the USSR from the Tenth to the Twentieth Centuries". History of Education Quarterly 31#2 (1991), pp. 229–252. [www.jstor.org/stable/368437 Online].
 Nove, Alec. Soviet economic system (1986).
 Weiner, Douglas R. "Struggle over the Soviet future: Science education versus vocationalism during the 1920s." Russian Review 65.1 (2006): 72–97.

Nationalities 
 Katz, Zev, ed.: Handbook of Major Soviet Nationalities (New York: Free Press, 1975).
 Nahaylo, Bohdan and Victor Swoboda. Soviet Disunion: A History of the nationalities Nationalities problem in the USSR (1990) excerpt.
 Rashid, Ahmed. The Resurgence of Central Asia: Islam or Nationalism? (2017).
 Smith, Graham, ed. The Nationalities Question in the Soviet Union (2nd ed. 1995).

Specialty studies 
 Armstrong, John A. The Politics of Totalitarianism: The Communist Party of the Soviet Union from 1934 to the Present. New York: Random House, 1961.
 Moore, Jr., Barrington. Soviet politics: the dilemma of power. Cambridge, MA: Harvard University Press, 1950.
 Rizzi, Bruno: The Bureaucratization of the World: The First English edition of the Underground Marxist Classic That Analyzed Class Exploitation in the USSR, New York, NY: Free Press, 1985.
 Schapiro, Leonard B. The Origin of the Communist Autocracy: Political Opposition in the Soviet State, First Phase 1917–1922. Cambridge, MA: Harvard University Press, 1955, 1966.
 Smolkin, Victoria/  A Sacred Space is Never Empty: A History of Soviet Atheism (Princeton UP, 2018) online reviews

External links

 
 Impressions of Soviet Russia by John Dewey
 A Country Study: Soviet Union (PDF)

 
States and territories established in 1922
States and territories disestablished in 1991
20th century in Russia
 
 
Atheist states
Communism in Russia
Former countries in Europe
Former countries in Western Asia
Former countries in Central Asia
Former countries in North Asia
Former empires
Former socialist republics
Totalitarian states
Historical transcontinental empires
Former member states of the United Nations
Russian-speaking countries and territories